Roland Robinson may refer to:

Roland Robinson, 1st Baron Martonmere (1907–1989), British politician; Governor of Bermuda, 1964–1972
Roland Robinson (poet) (1912–1992), Australian poet and writer
Roland Robinson (musician) (1949–2004), American studio session bass player and songwriter